Far Arnside is a hamlet in Arnside civil parish in the South Lakeland district, Cumbria, England.

Location 
It is located near the large villages of Arnside and Silverdale. It is about half a mile north of the Cumbria/Lancashire boundary.

Nearby places of interest 
Nearby places of interest include Arnside Knott, Arnside Tower (a Peel tower) and Eaves Wood. Far Arnside is in the Arnside and Silverdale Area of Outstanding Natural Beauty. It has a caravan park called Far Arnside Caravan Park.

The Leeds Children's Charity's holiday centre was in Far Arnside, though more closely associated with Silverdale; it closed in 2016.

References 

 Philip's Street Atlas Cumbria (page 210)

Hamlets in Cumbria
Arnside